Constance of Aragon (1318–Montpellier, 1346) was Queen of Majorca as the wife of King James III. She was the eldest daughter of Alfonso IV of Aragon and his first wife, Teresa d'Entença.

James III wished to have friendly relations with Aragon, and thus married Constance in Perpignan on 24 September 1336. In 1342, he refused to take the oath of fealty to Constance's brother, Peter IV of Aragon.

James and Constance had two children:
 James (c. 1336 – January 20, 1375), pretender to the throne of Majorca
 Isabella (1337–1406), pretender to the throne of Majorca

In a short war (1343–44), James (and allegedly Constance) was driven out of Majorca by Peter, who annexed the Balearic Islands to the Crown of Aragon.

Two years later, Constance died in Montpellier. She was outlived by James and her two children. Her husband remarried the following year to Violante of Vilaragut.

References

Sources

|-

|-

1318 births
1346 deaths
House of Aragon
Majorcan queens consort
Consorts of Montpellier
Aragonese infantas
Daughters of kings